Edwin is a given name.

Edwin may also refer to:

Arts and entertainment
 Eadwine Psalter, 12th-century English illuminated manuscript, named after its scribe
 Edwin (film), a 1984 British television film starring Alec Guinness
 Edwin (play), a 1724 tragedy by George Jeffreys

Places
 Edwin, Alabama, US
 1046 Edwin, an asteroid discovered by George Van Biesbroeck and named after his son
 The Edwin, a building, formerly a hotel, in Toronto, Ontario, Canada

Other uses
 Edwin (company), a Japanese garment brand
 Edwin (ship), a 15-ton schooner wrecked near Cape Hawke, New South Wales, Australia, in late June 1816
 Edwin (surname)
 Edwin, an Emacs-like editor built into MIT/GNU Scheme